Jean-Yves Le Bouillonnec (born 15 September 1950) was a member of the National Assembly of France.  He represented Val-de-Marne's 11th constituency from 2002 to 2017, as a member of the Socialiste, radical, citoyen et divers gauche.

References

1950 births
Living people
Socialist Party (France) politicians
Deputies of the 12th National Assembly of the French Fifth Republic
Deputies of the 13th National Assembly of the French Fifth Republic
Deputies of the 14th National Assembly of the French Fifth Republic